Margaret Ellen Hurley (née Morse; September 10, 1909 – August 29, 2015) was an American politician in the state of Washington. Hurley served in the Washington House of Representatives as a Democrat from the 3rd district from 1953–1979, succeeding her husband, Joseph E. Hurley. She served in the Washington State Senate from 1979–1984, to replace the unexpired term of Katherine Reid. On both occasions, she was succeeded by Lois Stratton.

She lived in Washington since the age of 2, and was a former teacher.

She turned 100 in September 2009. Hurley died days before her 106th birthday in 2015.

References

1909 births
2015 deaths
People from Winnebago, Minnesota
Women state legislators in Washington (state)
Democratic Party Washington (state) state senators
Democratic Party members of the Washington House of Representatives
American centenarians
Politicians from Tacoma, Washington
Women centenarians
21st-century American women